Platyptilia longiloba is a moth of the family Pterophoridae.

References 

Moths described in 1997
longiloba